Mary H. "Susie" McAllister (born August 27, 1947) is an American professional golfer who played on the LPGA Tour.

McAllister won once on the LPGA Tour in 1975.

She was married to comedian Gary Morton from 1996 until his death in 1999.

Professional wins

LPGA Tour wins (1)

LPGA Tour playoff record (0–1)

References

External links

American female golfers
Lamar Lady Cardinals golfers
LPGA Tour golfers
Golfers from Texas
Sportspeople from Beaumont, Texas
1947 births
Living people